The Democratic National Committee (DNC) is the governing body of the United States Democratic Party. The committee coordinates strategy to support Democratic Party candidates throughout the country for local, state, and national office, as well as works to establish a "party brand". It organizes the Democratic National Convention held every four years to nominate a candidate for President of the United States and to formulate the party platform. While it provides support for party candidates, it does not have direct authority over elected officials. When a Democrat is president, the White House controls the Committee.  According to Boris Heersink, "political scientists have traditionally described the parties’ national committees as inconsequential but impartial service providers."

Its chair is elected by the committee. It conducts fundraising to support its activities.

The DNC was established on May 26, 1848, at that year's Democratic National Convention. The DNC's main counterpart is the Republican National Committee.

Role and organization

The DNC is responsible for articulating and promoting the Democratic platform and coordinating party organizational activity. When the president is a Democrat, the party generally works closely with the president. In presidential elections, it supervises the national convention and, both independently and in coordination with the presidential candidate, raises funds, commissions polls, and coordinates campaign strategy. Following the selection of a party nominee, the public funding laws permit the national party to coordinate certain expenditures with the nominee, but additional funds are spent on general, party-building activities. There are state committees in every state, as well as local committees in most cities, wards, and towns (and, in most states, counties).

The chairperson of the DNC is elected by vote of members of the Democratic National Committee. The DNC is composed of the chairs and vice-chairs of each state Democratic Party's central committee, two hundred members apportioned among the states based on population and generally elected either on the ballot by primary voters or by the state Democratic Party committee, a number of elected officials serving in an ex officio capacity, and a variety of representatives of major Democratic Party constituencies.

The DNC establishes rules for the caucuses and primaries which choose delegates to the Democratic National Convention, but the caucuses and primaries themselves are most often run not by the DNC but instead by each individual state. Primary elections, in particular, are invariably conducted by state governments according to their own laws. Political parties may choose to participate or not participate in a state's primary election, but no political party executives have any jurisdiction over the dates of primary elections, or how they are conducted.

All DNC members are superdelegates to the Democratic National Convention, and their role can affect the outcome over a close primary race only if no candidate receives a majority of pledged delegates. These delegates, officially described as "unpledged party leader and elected official delegates," fall into three categories based on other positions they hold:
 elected members of the Democratic National Committee,
 sitting Democratic governors and members of Congress, and
 distinguished party leaders, consisting of current and former presidents, vice presidents, congressional leaders, and DNC chairs, are all superdelegates for life.

Leadership
 Chair: Jaime Harrison, former Chairman of the South Carolina Democratic Party
Executive Director: Sam Cornale, former Chief of Staff of the Democratic National Committee
Deputy Executive Director: Roger Lau, former Campaign Manager for Elizabeth Warren for President
Political Director: Alana Mounce, former Executive Director of the Nevada State Democratic Party
Chief of Staff: Anatole Jenkins, former National Organizing Director for Kamala Harris For The People
 Vice Chair of Civic Engagement and Voter Participation: Keisha Lance Bottoms
 Vice Chairs:
Gretchen Whitmer, Governor of Michigan
 Tammy Duckworth, U.S. Senator from Illinois
 Ken Martin, Chair of the Minnesota Democratic-Farmer-Labor Party
 Vacant
 Treasurer: Virginia McGregor
 Secretary: Jason Rae
 Finance Chair: Chris Korge

In addition, a National Advisory Board exists for purposes of fundraising and advising the executive. The present chair is Elizabeth Frawley Bagley, former U.S. Ambassador to Portugal.

Chairs of the Democratic National Committee

Deputy Chairs
The Deputy Chair of the Democratic National Committee was re-established by Tom Perez in February 2017 after his win in the 2017 DNC Chair race.

After a close victory over Minnesota Congressman Keith Ellison, Perez appointed Ellison as Deputy Chair in an attempt to lessen the divide in the Democratic Party after the contentious 2016 Democratic presidential primaries, which saw conflicts between supporters of Hillary Clinton and Bernie Sanders. Perez was seen as being more in line with the Clinton wing, while Ellison was more in line with the Sanders wing. The role's revival in 2017 has been described by critics as largely titular and ceremonial.

On November 8, 2018, Ellison resigned from the position due to his win in the Minnesota Attorney General election. The position remains unoccupied.

Treasurers of the Democratic National Committee

Controversies

Watergate 

In the 1970s, the DNC had its head office in the Watergate complex, which was burglarized by entities working for Richard Nixon's administration during the Watergate scandal.

Chinagate 

Chinagate was an alleged effort by the People's Republic of China to influence domestic American politics prior to and during the Clinton administration. In 2002, the Federal Election Commission fined the Democratic National Committee $115,000 for its part in fundraising violations in 1996.

Cyber attacks 

Cyber attacks and hacks were claimed by or attributed to various individual and groups such as:
 According to committee officials and security experts, two competing Russian intelligence services were discovered on DNC computer networks. One intelligence service achieved infiltration beginning in the summer of 2015 and the other service breached and roamed the network beginning in April 2016. The two groups accessed emails, chats, and research on an opposing presidential candidate. They were expelled from the DNC system in June 2016.
 The hacker Guccifer 2.0 claimed that he hacked into the Democratic National Committee computer network and then leaked its emails to the newspaper The Hill. During a CNN interview with Jake Tapper, Hillary Clinton's campaign manager, Robby Mook, cited experts saying that the DNC emails were leaked by the Russians but did not name the experts. The press and cybersecurity firms discredited the Guccifer 2.0 claim, as investigators now believe Guccifer 2.0 was an agent of the G.R.U., Russia's military intelligence service.

2016 email leak

On July 22, 2016, WikiLeaks released approximately 20,000 DNC emails. Critics claimed that the Committee unequally favored Hillary Clinton and acted in support of her nomination while opposing the candidacy of her primary challenger Bernie Sanders. Donna Brazile corroborated these allegations in an excerpt of her book published by Politico in November 2017. The leaked emails spanned sixteen months, terminating in May 2016.

The WikiLeaks releases led to the resignations of Chairperson Debbie Wasserman Schultz, Communications Director Luis Miranda, Chief Financial Officer Brad Marshall and Chief Executive Amy Dacey. After she resigned, Wasserman Schultz put out a statement about possible FBI assistance in investigating the hacking and leaks, saying that "the DNC was never contacted by the FBI or any other agency concerned about these intrusions." During a Senate hearing in January 2017, James Comey testified that the FBI requested access to the DNC's servers, but its request was denied. He also testified that old versions of the Republican National Committee's servers were breached, but then-current databases were unaffected.

The DNC subsequently filed a lawsuit in federal court against WikiLeaks and others alleging a conspiracy to influence the election.

History 
The DNC has existed since 1848. During the 1848 Democratic National Convention, a resolution was passed creating the Democratic National Committee, composed of thirty members, one person per state, chosen by the states' delegations, and chaired by Benjamin F. Hallett.

See also 
 Green National Committee
 Libertarian National Committee
 Republican National Committee
Information published by WikiLeaks

References

Further reading

 Cotter, Cornelius P., and Bernard C. Hennessy, eds. Politics without Power: The National Party Committees (1964) 
 Galvin, Daniel J. “ The Transformation of Political Institutions: Investments in Institutional Resources and Gradual Change in the National Party Committees,” Studies in American Political Development 26.1 (April 2012): 50-70; . .
 Goldman, Ralph M. The National party Chairmen and Committees: Factionalism at the Top (M.E. Sharpe, 1990)
 Heersink, Boris. "Examining Democratic and Republican National Committee Party Branding Activity, 1953–2012." Perspectives on Politics (2021): 1-18. .
 Heersink, Boris. "Trump and the party-in-organization: Presidential control of national party organizations." Journal of Politics 80.4 (2018): 1474-1482. .
 Heersink, Boris. "Party Brands and the Democratic and Republican National Committees, 1952–1976." Studies in American Political Development 32.1 (2018): 79-102. .
 Hejny, Jessica, and Adam Hilton. "Bringing contention in: a critical perspective on political parties as institutions." Studies in Political Economy 102.2 (2021): 161-181. .
 Herrnson, Paul S. “The Evolution of National Party Organizations,” in The Oxford Handbook of American Political Parties and Interest Groups, edited by Louis Sandy Maisel and Jeffrey M. Berry. (Oxford University Press, 2010) pp. 245-264. . .
 Klinkner, Philip A. The Losing Parties: Out-Party National Committees, 1956-1993 (Yale University Press, 1994)
 Pavlov, Eugene, and Natalie Mizik. "Brand Political Positioning: Implications of the 2016 US Presidential Election." (2020)  .

External links

 
 The Charter & The Bylaws of the Democratic Party of the United States (PDF) as amended by the DNC; August 25, 2018
 Democratic National Committee – 2016 (members)

 
National Committee
Factions in the Democratic Party (United States)
Political parties established in 1848
Executive committees of political parties
1848 establishments in the United States